Denver Harris is an American football cornerback for the LSU Tigers. He previously played for the Texas A&M Aggies.

High school career 
Harris attended North Shore Senior High School in Harris County, Texas. As a senior he helped North Shore win a state championship in the states top division and played in the Under Armour All-America Game. A 5 star recruit ranked the nations 23rd overall prospect, he committed to Texas A&M over offers from Alabama, LSU and Texas.

College career 
Harris started as a freshman and at midseason was named to The Athletic/PFF midseason freshman All-American team. On October 25 it was announced that Harris and teammates Chris Marshall and PJ Williams had been indefinitely suspended from the team following a locker room incident prior to the Aggies loss to South Carolina.

On December 22, 2022, Harris announced on Twitter that he would transfer to LSU.

References

External links
 Texas A&M bio

American football cornerbacks
Living people
LSU Tigers football players
Year of birth missing (living people)